Outtrim was the terminus station on the Outtrim railway line. It closed in 1951 along with Outtrim North. The first sod of soil turned in the construction of the Outtrim railway line was on 6 March 1885. The line was completed by 1896.

See also
Outtrim, Victoria

Disused railway stations in Victoria (Australia)
Transport in Gippsland (region)
Shire of South Gippsland